Diphosphorus tetraiodide is an orange crystalline solid with the formula P2I4. It has been used as a reducing agent in organic chemistry.  It is a rare example of a compound with phosphorus in the +2 oxidation state, and can be classified as a subhalide of phosphorus.  It is the most stable of the diphosphorus tetrahalides.

Synthesis and structure
Diphosphorus tetraiodide is easily generated by the disproportionation of phosphorus triiodide in dry ether:
2 PI3 → P2I4 + I2

It can also be obtained by treating phosphorus trichloride and potassium iodide in anhydrous conditions.

The compound adopts a centrosymmetric structure with a P-P bond of 2.230 Å.

Reactions

Inorganic chemistry
Diphosphorus tetraiodide reacts with bromine to form mixtures PI3−xBrx.  With sulfur, it is oxidized to P2S2I4, retaining the P-P bond. It reacts with elemental phosphorus and water to make phosphonium iodide, which is collected via sublimation at 80 °C.

Organic chemistry
Diphosphorus tetraiodide is used in organic synthesis mainly as a deoxygenating agent. It is used for deprotecting acetals and ketals to aldehydes and ketones, and for converting epoxides into alkenes and aldoximes into nitriles. It can also cyclize 2-aminoalcohols to aziridines and to convert α,β-unsaturated carboxylic acids to α,β-unsaturated bromides.

As foreshadowed by the work of Bertholet in 1855, diphosphorus tetraiodide can convert glycols to trans alkenes.  This reaction is known as the Kuhn–Winterstein reaction, after the chemists who applied it to the production of polyene chromophores.

References

Phosphorus iodides
Phosphorus(II) compounds
Phosphanes
Reducing agents